Marmalade SDK was a cross-platform software development kit and game engine from Marmalade Technologies Limited (previously known as Ideaworks3D Limited) that contains library files, samples, documentation and tools required to develop, test and deploy applications for mobile devices.

Overview
The underlying concept of the Marmalade SDK is write once, run anywhere so that a single codebase can be compiled and executed on all supported platforms rather than needing to be written in different programming languages using a different API for each platform.  This is achieved by providing a C/C++ based API which acts as an abstraction layer for the core API of each platform.

Depending on the license purchased, Marmalade SDK supports deployment of applications to the following platforms: Android, BlackBerry 10, iOS, LG Smart TV, Tizen, Mac OS X, Windows Desktop, Roku 2, Roku 3, and Windows Phone 8, but not Linux.

The main Marmalade SDK consists of two main layers.  A low level C API called Marmalade System provides an abstraction layer that allows a programmer access to device functionality such as memory management, file access, timers, networking, input methods (e.g. accelerometer, keyboard, touch screen) and sound and video output.  Marmalade SDK is a C++ API that provides higher level functionality mostly focused on support for 2D (e.g. bitmap handling, fonts) and 3D graphics rendering (e.g. 3D mesh rendering, boned animation).  It includes an extensible resource management system and HTTP networking. Marmalade SDK supports Objective C.

Marmalade SDK allows access to the graphics rendering capabilities of mobile devices either by using the OpenGL ES API directly (both OpenGL ES 1.x and 2.x are supported) or by using the functionality provided by the Marmalade SDK layer. Marmalade  SDK provides support for loading and rendering graphics resources such as bitmap images and 3D model data which would need to be implemented by the user if using OpenGL ES directly.  Marmalade SDK provides exporter plug-ins for use with Autodesk 3DS Max and Autodesk Maya to allow 3D models and animations to be used in applications. For supporting older devices with no dedicated rendering hardware, a legacy software based rendering option is provided. On 9 October 2015, Marmalade introduced its own 2D and 3D authoring tools.

Marmalade Technologies Limited formerly Ideaworks Ltd, the maker of the 2D/3D Marmalade SDK announced in September 2016 the ceasing of production and support of its Marmalade Game Platform, choosing instead to focus on the output of its own game studio known as Marmalade Game Studio Ltd. The company announced that after the final iteration in March 2017 the licence server will be turned off and support will cease. 
In January 2017 GMO Cloud– based in Japan obtains the exclusive rights to use the Marmalade SDK which supports both native and hybrid browser-based apps, accelerating the development of new features and supporting game and app development.

In May 2018, GMO Cloud announced the discontinuation of Marmalade.

Reception
On November 12, 2015 the Marmalade Platform won at The Independent Game Developers' Association Awards 2015 in the category of "Best Engines & Middleware, Tools & Tech".

Games
This is a list of notable games which had been built using the Marmalade SDK.

 Angry Birds POP!
 Backbreaker
 Call of Duty: World at War: Zombies
 Doodle Jump
 Draw Something
 Godus
 Lara Croft and the Guardian of Light
 Metal Gear Solid Mobile
 Need for Speed: Shift
 Peggle
 Plants vs. Zombies
 Pro Evolution Soccer games
 SimCity Build It
 Tetris
 Worms
 Vector
  Eternium
  Creature Quest
  Expendable:Rearmed

Marmalade's in house game development is through Marmalade Game Studio Ltd. and publish the following games:

 
  Cluedo
  The Game of Life
  Spinguins
  RIZE: Zombies
   Sudoku 4Two Multiplayer

References

External links 
  SDK
  Games
 Marmalade SDK Mobile Game Development Essentials - a book covering the usage of the Marmalade SDK from the perspective of a video game programmer

Application programming interfaces
Mobile software
Software development kits